Doris Edna Smith (née Elliott) (12 August 1919 – before 1994) was an Irish writer of over 20 gothic and romance novels. In 1969, her novel Comfort and Keep won the Romantic Novel of the Year Award by the Romantic Novelists' Association.

Biography
Smith was born on 12 August 1919 in Dublin, Ireland. She was educated at Alexandra College in Milltown, Dublin. From 1938 worked for an Dublin's insurance group.

Bibliography
 Song from a Lemon Tree (1966)
 The Thornwood (1966)
 The Deep are Dumb (1967)
 Comfort and Keep (1968)
 Fire Is for Sharing (1968)
 To Sing Me Home (1969)
 Seven of Magpies (1970)
 Cup of Kindness (1971)
 Young Green Corn (1971)
 Dear Deceiver (1972)
 The One and Only (1973)
 The Marrying Kind (1974)
 Green Apple Love (1974)
 Haste to the Wedding (1974)
 Cotswold Honey (1975)
 Smuggled Love (1976)
 Wild Heart (1976)
 My Love Come Back (1978)
 Mix Me a Man (1979)
 Back O'the Moon (1981)
 Catch a Kingfisher (1981)
 Marmalade Witch (1982)
 Noah's Daughter (1982)

References and sources

1919 births
Year of death missing
Writers from Dublin (city)
Irish romantic fiction writers
RoNA Award winners
People educated at Alexandra College
20th-century Irish novelists
20th-century Irish women writers
Women romantic fiction writers
Irish women novelists